Everything I Know About Love is a 2018 memoir by the British journalist Dolly Alderton, in which the author recounts the adventures of a woman navigating her 20s.

Reception
The book earned a 2018 National Book Award for autobiography and was shortlisted for the 2019 Non-Fiction Narrative Book of the Year in the British Book Awards, and adapted into a BBC/Peacock eponymous television drama series. The book has been translated into 20 languages including Polish and Russian.

At Goodreads, the book has an average rating of 4.11 (out of 5) based on 129,353 ratings.

References

External links
 

2018 non-fiction books
British memoirs
Books about the philosophy of love
Books about the philosophy of sexuality
English-language books

pl:Wszystko, co wiem o miłości